Bruce Kapler (born July 3, 1953) was a member of the CBS Orchestra on Late Show with David Letterman from 1993 to 2012.  He sings and plays several instruments including soprano, alto, tenor, baritone and bass saxophone, flute, clarinet, recorder, keyboards, guitar,  and percussion.

Biography
In 1971 Kapler graduated from Walt Whitman High School, South Huntington on Long Island, New York.  
Kapler toured, both nationally and internationally throughout the 1970s, 1980s and early 1990s.
Kapler worked as a musician and arranger on NBC's Late Night with David Letterman beginning in 1988, and in 1993 he joined the CBS Orchestra.  
He has been nominated for an Emmy Award Late Night with David Letterman's Tenth Anniversary primetime special.

The general public may be most familiar with his Baritone Saxophone solo backing up Darlene Love annually on the last David Letterman show before Christmas Day.

Kapler is married to Melissa Caro and has a son Kevin.

Notes 

Living people
American multi-instrumentalists
Paul Shaffer and the World's Most Dangerous Band members
1953 births